The El Paso Chihuahuas are a Minor League Baseball team of the Pacific Coast League (PCL) and the Triple-A affiliate of the San Diego Padres. They are located in El Paso, Texas, and play their home games at Southwest University Park, which opened in 2014. The Chihuahuas moved to El Paso from Tucson, Arizona, where they were known as the Tucson Padres. They played in the PCL until the 2021 restructuring of the minor leagues when they shifted to the Triple-A West, but this league was renamed the PCL in 2022. The Chihuahuas won the PCL championship in 2016.

History

Previous teams
The Chihuahuas' heritage can be traced back to the establishment of the original Los Angeles Angels in 1903. These Angels (the namesake of the current Los Angeles Angels) were one of the eight "core teams" of the PCL during its heyday in the 1950s. In 1957, the team was sold to Brooklyn Dodgers owner Walter O'Malley as a harbinger of the Dodgers' move to Los Angeles the following year.

For 1958, the Angels moved to Spokane, Washington, and became the (original) Spokane Indians. In 1972, the team moved again, this time to Albuquerque, New Mexico. As the Albuquerque Dukes, many of the team's star players and manager Tommy Lasorda formed the core of a Dodgers franchise that won the 1977, 1978, and 1981 pennants and 1981 World Series title.

After nearly two decades, the Dukes moved to Portland, Oregon, and became the latest version of the Portland Beavers in 2001. That franchise lasted 10 seasons until the inability to get a new ballpark to replace what is now Providence Park (renovated to accommodate the Portland Timbers of Major League Soccer) led to a relocation. But once again, a new ballpark proved elusive, and the team landed in Tucson, Arizona, as the Tucson Padres.

Coming to El Paso
On July 30, 2012, the Pacific Coast League gave preliminary approval to MountainStar Sports Group to buy the Padres, with the intent to relocate the franchise to El Paso for the 2014 season. The deal was approved on September 17, 2012, pending approval for a ballpark by the city council. Ballpark approval was made on September 18, with the mayor deciding not to veto the deal. The final sale of the Padres to MountainStar Sports was approved on September 26, 2012.

A name-the-team contest was held to decide the team's nickname. Finalists were Aardvarks, Buckaroos, Chihuahuas, Desert Gators, and Sun Dogs. The winning name was submitted by Shae Vierra. On October 22, 2013, the Chihuahuas name, logo and colors were announced. The name is a reference to the Chihuahuan Desert encompassing the area.  The team logo is a growling chihuahua dog.

Due to construction delays at the site of Southwest University Park, the Chihuahuas played their first 24 games of the 2014 season on the road, including a four-game series against the Reno Aces that was moved from El Paso to Tucson. The home opener finally took place on April 28, a 2–1 loss to the Fresno Grizzlies.

On September 17, 2016, the Chihuahuas plated a run in the 11th inning to defeat the Oklahoma City Dodgers 4–3 to claim the El Paso's first ever PCL championship in just the franchise's third year of existence.

In conjunction with Major League Baseball's restructuring of Minor League Baseball in 2021, the Chihuahuas were organized into the Triple-A West. El Paso ended the season in fifth place in the Eastern Division with a 46–74 record. No playoffs were held to determine a league champion; instead, the team with the best regular-season record was declared the winner. However, 10 games that had been postponed from the start of the season were reinserted into the schedule as a postseason tournament called the Triple-A Final Stretch in which all 30 Triple-A clubs competed for the highest winning percentage. El Paso finished the tournament tied for 13th place with a 5–5 record. In 2022, the Triple-A West became known as the Pacific Coast League, the name historically used by the regional circuit prior to the 2021 reorganization.

Season-by-season records

Notable players

Abraham Almonte
Billy Buckner
Robinson Cano
Cody Decker
Jeff Francoeur
Rocky Gale
Jake Lemmerman
Kevin Quackenbush
Carlos Quentin
Seth Rosin
Cory Spangenberg
Melvin Upton Jr.
Brett Wallace

Roster

References

External links

 
 Statistics from Baseball-Reference

 
Professional baseball teams in Texas
Pacific Coast League teams
Baseball teams established in 2014
San Diego Padres minor league affiliates
2014 establishments in Texas
Triple-A West teams